The 2018 LPGA of Korea Tour was the 41st season of the LPGA of Korea Tour, the professional golf tour for women operated by the Korea Ladies Professional Golf' Association.

Schedule
The number in parentheses after winners' names show the player's total number wins in official money individual events on the LPGA of Korea Tour, including that event.

Events in bold are majors.

External links
 

2018
2018 in women's golf
2018 in South Korean sport